Taktalachuk (Taqtalasıq) is a rural locality (a village) in Kuyanovsky Selsoviet, Krasnokamsky District, Bashkortostan, Russia. The population was 25 as of 2010. There are 2 streets.

Geography 
Taktalachuk is located 61 km southeast of Nikolo-Beryozovka (the district's administrative centre) by road. Stary Ashit is the nearest rural locality.

References 

Rural localities in Krasnokamsky District